Warpalawa(s) (possibly Warpalawa II) was a late 8th century BC (ca 730-710 BC?) Late Hittite (or Neo-Hittite) king of Tabal in south-central Anatolia (modern Turkey). The political center of this Early Iron Age regional state was probably Tuwana (later Graeco-Roman Tyana). 

Warpalawa is first attested among the five regional rulers who paid tribute to Tiglath-pileser III (745-727 BC).

Monuments 
Among other commemorative monuments, Warpalawas most notably commissioned the carving of the İvriz relief, a rock relief at the site of Ivriz near a spring, south of Tuwanuwa in the province of Konya. In the relief, he is depicted with the storm-god Tarhunzas. His attire in the relief is seen as an evidence for his kingdom's close affinity with the Phrygians. The relief is accompanied with a hieroglyphic Luwian inscription. The Tabalian king Urballa, mentioned in the Assyrian texts at the time of Tiglath-pileser III and Sargon II probably is Warpalawas.

Some scholars assume that Warpalawa was a subordinate of Wasusarma. This assumption was being made based on the fact that Wasusarma assumed the title ‘‘Great King’’.

Some scholars believe that there was a small dynasty of Warpalawa's, with Warpalawa I ruling early in the 8th century before Warpalawa II.

Notes

Bibliography

 Melchert, H C. (ed.); 2003. The Luwians. (Leiden: Brill Publishers).  (ebook)  (print)
 Hawkins, J. David; 1999. The Corpus of Hieroglyphic Luwian Inscriptions. Berlin: Walter de Gruyter. .

External links 
 Bor Stele, also known as Warpalawa Stele - hittitemonuments.com

Tabal
Iron Age
Syro-Hittite kings
Rock reliefs in Turkey